Colin Sauer (13 July 1924 – 9 January 2015 ) was a violinist and chamber musician who lead the Dartington String Quartet for over 20 years. He played with the Hallé Orchestra under John Barbirolli and the BBC Symphony Orchestra under Adrian Boult. Colin also conducted the Devon Fellowship of Music Youth Orchestra where he inspired many generations of young musicians.

References

External links 
http://www.allegriquartet.org.uk/Articles/retirement.htm
http://www.dartington.org/archive/display/TPH/08/001/101

People from Ilford
English violinists
British male violinists
1924 births
2015 deaths
20th-century violinists
20th-century English musicians
20th-century British male musicians